Agility Trains is consortium of Hitachi, Axa UK and John Laing, which has been awarded a contract to design, manufacture, and maintain a fleet of long-distance class 800 and 801 trains to replace the InterCity 125 fleet as part of the Department for Transport's Intercity Express Programme.

The class 800 and 801s are designed to provide more seats and reduced journey times whilst being more environmentally friendly. Originally a 70/30 joint venture between Hitachi and John Laing, in March 2018, Axa purchased half of John Laing's shareholding.

In November 2021 GLIL Infrastructure purchase a 30% stake from Hitachi.

References

External links
Agility Trains

Axa
Hitachi rolling stock
John Laing Group
Railway companies established in 2008
2008 establishments in England